Julio Cesar González Montemurro is a Uruguayan football manager and former player.

He coached the Honduras national football team at the 1993 CONCACAF Gold Cup.

References 

1953 births
Sportspeople from Montevideo
Uruguayan football managers
Club Puebla managers
F.C. Motagua managers
Living people
20th-century Uruguayan people
21st-century Uruguayan people
Cúcuta Deportivo managers